King Night is the debut album by the American electronic music group Salem. The album was released on September 28, 2010 on IAMSOUND Records. The vinyl and European versions of King Night were released on October 12, 2010. It was mixed by Dave Sardy and included six brand new songs, along with five older songs that were previously released and/or leaked.

On Insound, the album's first single, "Asia", was included free with the pre-order of the album. The single came in 7" vinyl with a remastered version of the previously released song "Dirt" as the B-side.

King Night was generally well received by music critics. The album charted at number 22 on the US Billboard Heatseekers Albums chart.

Accolades

Track listing

Charts

References

2010 debut albums
Iamsound Records albums
Salem (American band) albums